Nathan M. Schulhof (born May 17, 1949 in Pittsburgh, Pennsylvania) is a technology industry entrepreneur with a career that spans over three decades. Schulhof is listed as the lead inventor on three U.S. patents (5,557,541; 5,572,442 and 5,841,979),.

However, Schulhof is also listed as co-inventor on another U.S. patent (6,549,942), and a fifth U.S. patent (5,914,941) references 5,557,541 and was assigned (as were the other four patents) to Audio Highway Media Corporation (a company co-founded and led by Schulhof when the patents were filed and/or issued). Audio Highway's Listen Up Player, the father of the MP3 player, won an Innovation Award from the Consumer Electronics Show in 1997 and a 1998 People's Choice Award at the 2nd annual Internet Showcase conference, held Jan. 30, 1998 and presented by Upside Media, Inc. and event host and co-founder, David Coursey.Because of his very early patents for a downloadable portable media player, Schulhof is often thought of as the father of the MP3 player.
 

These patents, along with the remaining assets of audiohighway.com, were acquired in 2003 by Sony Corp.

In addition to his career with Information Highway Media Corp. (later renamed Audio Highway and then audiohighway.com) where Schulhof served as president, CEO and board member, he has also held executive positions with HandHeld Entertainment, TestDrive Corporation, Silicon Valley Systems and Jasmine Systems.

Schulhof co-founded Solar Components, LLC, a Silicon Valley-based firm in the solar power industry. Originally from the Pittsburgh, Pennsylvania area, Schulhof currently resides in Southern California.

References

External links
 Father of MP3 player shares his culture-changing invention; 18 October 2010; KSL-TV; Salt Lake City, Utah, USA

1949 births
20th-century American inventors
Living people
Businesspeople from Pittsburgh